Anna Archibald (born 14 September 1959) is a retired alpine skier from Christchurch, New Zealand.

Archibald was a New Zealand alpine champion in 1977 and 1978. She competed for New Zealand at the 1980 Winter Olympics, finishing 26th, a position which is still the equal best finish position of any New Zealand Olympic downhiller.

References 

Living people 
1959 births
New Zealand female alpine skiers
Olympic alpine skiers of New Zealand
Alpine skiers at the 1980 Winter Olympics 
Sportspeople from Christchurch
20th-century New Zealand women